Group A of the 2004 Fed Cup Europe/Africa Zone Group I was one of four pools in the Europe/Africa Zone Group I of the 2004 Fed Cup. Three teams competed in a round robin competition, with the top two teams advancing to the advancement play-offs and the bottom team being relegated down to the relegation play-offs.

Sweden vs. Lithuania

Serbia and Montenegro vs. Lithuania

Sweden vs. Serbia and Montenegro

See also
Fed Cup structure

References

External links
 Fed Cup website

2004 Fed Cup Europe/Africa Zone